Bay State Brawlers Roller Derby, (BSB), is a women's flat-track roller derby league based in the twin cities of Fitchburg and Leominster, Massachusetts. Founded in 2008, Bay State is a member of the Women's Flat Track Derby Association (WFTDA).

History and organization
Bay State was founded in 2008 as "Central Mass Roller Derby", and became Bay State Brawlers Roller Derby in 2011. Bay State joined the WFTDA Apprentice Program in 2013, and became a full member league in July 2014.

In 2014, the league featured 5 teams, the Petticoat Pushers, Brawlin’ Broads, Bluestocking Bombers, LumberJackies, and Switchblade Sallies. As of 2017, the league has two teams that play teams from other leagues, the A-level Punishers, and the Brawlin' Broads B team, with home events held at the Wallace Civic Center on the Fitchburg State University campus. The league is a non-profit organization, whose 30-40 members fundraise for various causes.

WFTDA rankings

References

Roller derby leagues in Massachusetts
Sports in Fitchburg, Massachusetts
Leominster, Massachusetts
Roller derby leagues established in 2008
Sports in Worcester County, Massachusetts
Women's Flat Track Derby Association leagues
2008 establishments in Massachusetts
Women's sports in Massachusetts